Bernard Philip Kelly (April 25, 1907—November 2, 1958) was an English Catholic layman who worked in a bank, raised a large family, and regularly penned, over 25 years, philosophical essays and book reviews for the Dominican journal Blackfriars. His friendship with foremost British Thomists and leading distributists of his day, and with the Indian scholar Ananda Coomaraswamy—along with his love for the poetry of Gerard Manley Hopkins—permitted his short life to become the matrix of a rich body of writings.

Works
Kelly's inspiration was drawn in part from scholastic philosophy and, in particular, the metaphysics of Thomas Aquinas. Among the themes developed in his writings were the social and economic theory of Distributism, reflections on the poetry of Gerard Manley Hopkins, the outlines of a critique of the modern world, and the development of an informed and Christian approach to Eastern religions. His seminal articles on Eastern philosophy and religion were among his last publications:

See also
Perennial philosophy
Gerard Manley Hopkins
Ananda Coomaraswamy
William Stoddart
Thomas Aquinas
Angus Macnab

References
Bernard Kelly, A Catholic Mind Awake, ed. with Introduction by Scott Randall Paine, Angelico Press, 2017.
William Stoddart, A Scholastic Universalist: The Writings and Thought of Bernard Kelly (1907–1958), New Blackfriars, Volume 76 Issue 897, pp. 455–462 Online text (PDF)

Notes

External links
https://angelicopress.org/product/a-catholic-mind-awake/ 
http://www.ncregister.com/daily-news/bernard-kelly-and-the-vigor-of-lay-thought
 Studies in Comparative Religion Archive Website

1907 births
1958 deaths
20th-century British writers
Traditionalist School
20th-century British philosophers